The following page lists power stations in Costa Rica. Most of them are managed by Instituto Costarricense de Electricidad.

Installed generating capacity and production 
Costa Rica had an estimated installed generating capacity of 3,039 MW in 2012 and produced an estimated 10.05 billion kWh in 2012. According to La Nación Costa Rica in 2014 had an installed capacity of 2,732 MW with a peak consumption of 1,604 MW.

Geothermal 
Geothermal power plants with a nameplate capacity > 100 MW.

There are further geothermal power plants with a smaller capacity.

Hydroelectric 
Hydroelectric power plants with a nameplate capacity > 30 MW.

There are further hydroelectric power plants with a smaller capacity. The proposed 630 MW El Diquís dam was not built.

Thermal 
Thermal power plants with a nameplate capacity ≥ 200 MW.

There are further thermal power plants with a smaller capacity.

Wind 
Currently, there are 13 wind farms in Costa Rica. The 3 wind farms with the biggest capacity are:

Exhaustive list
This list includes all known power plants of any kind of fuel source in Costa Rica, some minor power plants might be missing, and locations and coordinates must be provided for minor projects, also included are recently closed or decommissioned plants, as well as projects under construction as of 2020.

See also

 Renewable energy in Costa Rica
 List of power stations

References

 
Power stations
Costa Rica